Jovian Infrared Auroral Mapper (JIRAM) is an instrument on the Juno spacecraft in orbit of the planet Jupiter. It is an image spectrometer and was contributed by Italy. Similar instruments are on ESA Rosetta, Venus Express, and Cassini-Huygens missions. The primary goal of JIRAM is to probe the upper layers of Jupiter's atmosphere down to pressures of 5–7 bars (72–102 pound/square inch) at infrared wavelengths in the 2–5 μm interval using an imager and a spectrometer. The Jupiter's atmosphere and auroral regions are targeted for study. In particular it has been designed to study the dynamics and chemistry in the atmosphere, perhaps determining the how Jovian hot spots form.

 ions, ammonia, and phosphine can be mapped. The ion of Hydrogen  is rare on Earth, but is one of the most common ions in the universe and known as protonated molecular hydrogen or the trihydrogen cation.

Despite the intense magnetosphere of Jupiter, the JIRAM is expected to be operational for at least the first eight orbits.

Previously Jupiter was observed by an Infrared imaging spectrometer called NIMS (Near-Infrared Mapping Spectrometer) on the Galileo Jupiter orbiter. JIRAM was used to observe Earth during its flyby en route to Jupiter. These observations were used to help calibrate the instrument, and the lunar observations were actually a critical planned step in preparing the instrument for observations at Jupiter. The polar orbit of the Juno mission permits to get unprecedented observations of the planet. In particular, the polar regions, that where never observed before Juno, can be observed with high spatial resolution.

On August 27, 2016, JIRAM observed Jupiter at infrared wavelengths. The first science observation in space was conducted on Earth's Moon in October 2013.

The JIRAM project was started by Professor Angioletta Coradini, however she died in 2011. The instrument was developed from Leonardo under the directions and supervision of the Institute for Space Astrophysics and Planetogy (IAPS) which is part of the Italian National Institute for Astrophysics and was funded by the Italian Space Agency. Dr. Alberto Adriani of IAPS is presently the responsible of the JIRAM project.

In March 2018, results from JIRAM were released showing both the North and south poles have a central cyclone surrounded by addition cyclones. The north cycle was surrounded by 8 cyclones, while the southern cyclone was surrounded by five. By this time Juno had completed 10 close passes for science observations, since arriving in Jupiter's orbit on July 4, 2016. The first science pass occurred on August 28, 2016, and JIRAM was operated during that pass.

Various results, including a 3-D movie a flyover of the north pole of Jupiter with JIRAM data were released at the European Geosciences Union General Assembly in April 2018.

Specifications

Mass: 8 kg (17.6 pounds, 1.259 stones) 
Max power use:16.7 watts
Observation range: 2–5 micron wavelength light

Observations

See also
Gravity Science
Jovian Auroral Distributions Experiment (JADE)
JunoCam
Magnetometer (Juno) (MAG)
Mapping Imaging Spectrometer for Europa
Microwave Radiometer (Juno)
MIRI (Mid-Infrared Instrument) (Infrared imaging spectrometer on JWST)
Ralph (New Horizons), imaging spectrometer on New Horizons, Pluto flyby probe
UVS (Juno) (Imaging spectrometer on Juno for ultraviolet light)
Atmosphere of Jupiter

References

External links
Juno JIRAM website
Jovian InfraRed Auroral Mapper – Lunar and Planetary Institute 
Juno instruments (Adobe Flash)
JIRAM images at JPL
NASA Juno Findings – Jupiter’s Jet-Streams Are Unearthly March 7, 2018
NASA's Juno Mission Provides Infrared Tour of Jupiter's North Pole (April 11, 2018)

Juno (spacecraft)
Spacecraft instruments
Italian Space Agency